Identity FX, a post-production division of Identity Studios, Inc., is a Visual Effects (VFX) company and Stereoscopic 3D design studio located in Los Angeles.  The company specializes in full-service visual effects and stereoscopic 3D conversion in post production.

For nearly a decade, Identity FX has created visuals for award-winning feature films, TV shows, and commercial campaigns. This North Hollywood-based VFX company completed visual effects, stereo conversion, and native stereo optimization work for more than one-hundred titles, including such projects as The Amazing Spider-Man, Prometheus, Conan the Barbarian, Green Lantern, The Chronicles of Narnia: The Voyage of the Dawn Treader, Hancock, Transformers, U23D, Paramount Park's 4D Borg Adventure, and the RealD Demos.

Company history 

Having established Shockwave Pictures, a digital production studio based in San Francisco, Leo Vezzali and David Scott Van Woert teamed up in Los Angeles on 2004 to co-found Identity FX, as a Visual Effects  and Post Production Studio.

In 2010, Identity FX officially transitioned from Visual Effects  into a Stereoscopic 3D studio, positioning itself as a top tier 2D to 3D conversion provider.

Upon the popularity of stereo 3D conversion in recent years, Identity FX had invested significantly in the expertise to develop and manage the 2D-to-3D conversion process. In November 2011, Identity FX took on the SGO Mistika 4K system which allows a "compelling combination of services that uniquely positions the studio to deliver camera-to-delivery 2D and stereo 3D services to its client base of Hollywood studios and feature film, television and commercial production companies worldwide."

Notable Releases 

Visual Effects and Stereo-3D
The Amazing Spider-Man
Prometheus
Conan the Barbarian
Green Lantern
The Chronicles of Narnia: The Voyage of the Dawn Treader
Transformers
Hancock
U23D
Death Race franchise
Hostel franchise

Commercials

Nike - Quick Controls Chaos Project
Coca-Cola
McDonald's
Google
Bethesda Software

Titles and Graphics
America's Next Top Models

Trailers
3net
Real D
Walden Media
Fox
Lions Gate
Universal
Warner Brothers
MGM
Fox Searchlight
Paramount Classics

References

External links 
 Official website

Visual effects companies